Luctonians Sports Club is an English sports club based in Kingsland, Herefordshire. The rugby union team currently plays in National League 2 West, the fourth tier of the English rugby union system, following their promotion from Midlands Premier at the end of the 2018–19 season via the play-offs. The club runs four senior sides and a full range of junior sides. Apart from rugby, Luctonians hosts the practice of cricket, golf, cycling, having also a netball, rounders, ladies touch and ladies contact section for women.

Ground
Luctonians play home games at Mortimer Park on Hereford Road in the village of Kingsland – about 4 miles from the nearest town, Leominster. Ground capacity is around 2,500 – a figure that includes 300 seated in the modern grandstand (completed in 2013) – with the rest standing space. Due to its rural location the only access to Mortimer Park is by car, although there is ample parking space.

On 27 April 2019, Luctonians achieved a record attendance of 1,757, who watched them defeat Blaydon in the Midlands-North play-off, to achieve promotion to National League 2 North.

Honours
 North Midlands 1 champions: 1993–94
 Midlands West 2 champions: 1994–95
 Midlands West 1 champions: 1995–96
 Midlands 2 (East v West) promotion play-off winners: 2000–01
 North Midlands Cup winners (4): 2004–05, 2005–06, 2007–08, 2008–09
 Midlands Premier v North Premier promotion play-off winners (2): 2009–10, 2018–19

Current standings

Notes

References

External links
 Official website

1948 establishments in England
English rugby union teams
Rugby clubs established in 1948
Rugby union in Herefordshire